The 2018 Ping An Chinese Football Association Super League was the 15th season since the establishment of the Chinese Super League. The league title sponsor was Ping An Insurance. Shanghai SIPG won their first top-tier league titles on 7 November 2018 after the 2–1 victory against Beijing Renhe, ending a historic run for Guangzhou Evergrande Taobao, who had won seven consecutive titles beginning with the 2011 season.

Policy regarding foreign players and U-23 domestic players continued to change in this season. At least one domestic player who is under the age of 23 (born on or after 1 January 1995) must be in the starting eleven, the same as in the 2017 season. However, two foreign-player policies have changed:  (1) the number of foreign players on a club's roster has been reduced from five to four and (2) the total number of foreign players under contract with a club in a season has been reduced from seven to six. In addition, a new policy affecting both foreign players and U-23 domestic players has been introduced: The total number of foreign players appearing in matches must be no more than the total number of U-23 domestic players. Players from AFC countries no longer hold a special slot. But clubs can register one non-naturalized player from the Hong Kong Football Association, Macau Football Association or Chinese Taipei Football Association (except goalkeepers) as a native player. According to the Chinese FA, a non-naturalized player is a player who was first registered as a professional footballer in one of the three aforementioned football associations. For still more complexity concerning non-naturalized players, players from Hong Kong and Macau must be passport holders of the Hong Kong SAR or the Macau SAR, and players from Taiwan must be citizens of Taiwan. Policy of U-23 domestic players was relaxed in August for the 2018 Asian Games. It existed in name only from October when China U-25 training team was organized.

Club changes 
Clubs promoted from 2017 China League One
 Dalian Yifang 
 Beijing Renhe

Clubs relegated to 2018 China League One
 Yanbian Funde
 Liaoning F.C.

Name changes 
 Guizhou Hengfeng Zhicheng F.C. changed their name to Guizhou Hengfeng F.C. in December 2017.

Clubs

Clubs and locations

Managerial changes

Foreign players

Clubs can register a total of six foreign players over the course of the season, but the number of foreign players allowed on each CSL team at any given time is limited to four. A maximum of three foreign players can be fielded in each match. In addition, each club can register a Hong Kong, Macau, or Taiwan player of Chinese descent (excluding goalkeepers), provided that he registered as a professional footballer in one of those three association for the first time, as a native player. 
Players name in bold indicates the player is registered during the mid-season transfer window.
Players in ITALICS have left the club, or are off the roster due to being injured or sent to the reserves.
Players that are not in bold or italicized have been signed by the club, but exceed the 4 foreign players on the roster at any one time.

 For Hong Kong, Macau, or Taiwanese players, if they are non-naturalized and were registered as professional footballers in Hong Kong's, Macau's, or Chinese Taipei's football association for the first time, they are recognized as native players. Otherwise they are recognized as foreign players.
 Festus Baise is a naturalized citizen of Hong Kong SAR; however, since his first registered football association was Hong Kong and is the passport holder of Hong Kong SAR, he would be considered as a native player.
 Player that has returned from a loan spell. It is unsure whether they will be registered for the season or sent out on loan again, but they are now on the wage bills of their respective clubs.

League table

Results

Positions by round

Results by match played

Goalscorers

Top scorers
Source:

Top assists
Source:

Hat-tricks

Awards
The awards of 2018 Chinese Super League were announced on 21 November 2018.

League attendance

References

External links
Current CSL table, and recent results/fixtures at Soccerway
Chinese Super League table at FIFA
Chinese Super League official site 

Chinese Super League seasons
1
China